Onisilos Sotira 2014 is a Cypriot association football club based in Sotira, Famagusta, located in the Famagusta District. Its stadium is the Sotira Municipal Stadium. It has 2 participations in STOK Elite Division.

History
Onisilos was founded in 2014 to replace the same-year dissolved club due to financial problems, Kentro Neon Onisilos Sotira. The name of the club comes from the Greek city-state of Salamis on the island of Cyprus, and Onesilus, who lived at the end of 5th century BC and at the beginning of 6th century BC and tried to liberate the island from Persians. The colours of the club are green and white.

Current squad 

For recent transfers, see List of Cypriot football transfers summer 2021.

Honours
Cypriot Third Division:
  Winners (1): 2017–18

STOK Elite Division:
  Winners (1): 2016–17 (shared record)

 Cypriot Cup for lower divisions:
   Winners (1): 2017–18 (shared record)

References

Football clubs in Cyprus
Association football clubs established in 2014
2014 establishments in Cyprus